Gol Chal Sar (also Romanized as Gol Chāl Sar; also known as Kalleh Chāleh Sar) is a village in Mehravan Rural District, in the Central District of Neka County, Mazandaran Province, Iran. At the 2006 census, its population was 169, in 39 families.

References 

Populated places in Neka County